Dishui Cave, also known as Dishui Hole or Mount Dishui, is a mountain with many caves. It is regarded as a "pearl" of the landscape of Shaoshan. The mountain is the farthest end of the long valley of Shaoshan. The rocks of the valley have been worn into caves by the dripping water of a stream. The caves are close to Dishuidong Mountain, Longtoushan Mountain on the south, the Huxieping Mountain on the north and the Niuxingshan Mountain at the back. There are great varieties of rare trees and flowers, such as azalea, camellia, cymbidium, camphor, cherries, ginkgo and others which are in blossom in different seasons.

Climate
Dishui Cave is in the subtropical monsoon climate zone and exhibits four distinct seasons.  Its climate characterized by torrid summers, chill winters and high humidity.

Gallery

See also
Mao Zedong's Former Residence

References

External links

Tourist attractions in Xiangtan
Shaoshan
Mao Zedong